Vandhoo as a place name may refer to:
 Vandhoo (Raa Atoll) (Republic of Maldives)
 Vandhoo (Thaa Atoll) (Republic of Maldives)